Gaoyu could refer to:

 Gaoyu, Ci County (高臾镇), town in southern Hebei, China
 Gaoyu, Anji County (高禹镇), town in Anji County, Zhejiang, China